Adigeni is a small town (daba) in eponymous municipality, Samtskhe-Javakheti, Georgia. It is located at the Akhaltsikhe structural basin, on the Kvabliani riverside, 32 km to the west of the regional center of Akhaltsikhe. As of the 2014 census, it had a population of 783. In the daba there are administrative, cultural, educational and healthcare offices.

See also
 Samtskhe-Javakheti

References 

Cities and towns in Samtskhe–Javakheti
Populated places in Adigeni Municipality